Cecelia Nabrit Adkins (September 3, 1923 – January 2, 2007) was an African-American publisher from Atlanta. She was the first woman, and first lay person, elected to the position of executive director of the Sunday School Publishing Board of the National Baptist Convention, USA, Inc. In this position, she was responsible for serving 35,000 churches and over 8 million constituents. She took up the position in 1975.

She died in Nashville, Tennessee, aged 83.

References

1923 births
2007 deaths
People from Atlanta
African-American publishers (people)
National Baptist Convention, USA ministers
20th-century African-American people
21st-century African-American people